Hu Chia-chen (born 28 March 1997) is a sprinter from Taiwan. She placed sixth and seventh in the 4 × 100 m relay at the 2014 and 2018 Asian Games respectively.

References

Taiwanese female sprinters
1997 births
Living people
Athletes (track and field) at the 2014 Asian Games
Athletes (track and field) at the 2018 Asian Games
Asian Games competitors for Chinese Taipei
21st-century Taiwanese women